Skynet is a family of military communications satellites, now operated by Airbus Defence and Space on behalf of the United Kingdom's Ministry of Defence (MoD). They provide strategic and tactical communication services to the branches of the British Armed Forces, the British intelligence agencies, some UK government departments and agencies, and to allied governments. Since 2015 when Skynet coverage was extended eastward, and in conjunction with an Anik G1 satellite module over America, Skynet offers near global coverage.

The Skynet contract allow Airbus Defence and Space to sell surplus bandwidth, through the Skynet partner programme, to NATO and allied governments, including the Five Eyes intelligence alliance members (Australia, Canada, New Zealand, the United Kingdom and the United States). As of 2020, seven Skynet satellites are operating, plus Anik G1.

The Skynet 1 to 4 series were developed and operated by the Signals Research and Development Establishment, Royal Signals and Radar Establishment and Royal Air Force until 2003. It was subsequently operated with Skynet 5 by Paradigm Secure Communications until October 2012, when the organisation was rebranded to Astrium Services then through merger in 2015 became Airbus Defence and Space.

The MoD is currently specifying a new architecture for Skynet to replace the Skynet 5 system, whose funding programme ends in August 2022. The vision for Skynet 6 is a flexible system architecture that combines UK government, allied and commercial satellites, including the current Skynet 5 satellites. Skynet is the large part of the MoD Future Beyond Line of Sight Satellite Communications programme (FBLOS), which extends to 2041, with expected transition costs of about £6 billion.

History 

In the 1960s, only two countries utilised communications satellites, the United States and the Soviet Union. The United Kingdom created Skynet as its own military communications satellite system, because of inadequate undersea communications cable availability and to increase flexibility, reliability, data capacity and security. The Signals Research and Development Establishment led the development of Skynet 1 and 2, and its successor Royal Signals and Radar Establishment carried out research for the development of the subsequent satellites and ground terminals.

The MoD space communications research programme began in 1962, initially considering Moon and space debris bounce techniques, before considering a UK satellite. In 1964, it was decided Skynet should be in geostationary orbit over the Indian Ocean, significantly to support East of Suez deployments, and have a transponder with two channels permitting communications between two types of ground station. This would be an advance over the ongoing U.S. Interim Defense Communication Satellite Program (IDCSP). In 1965, the U.S. invited the MoD to participate in their IDCSP programme, and to participate Marconi were contracted to build three 40 foot diameter air transportable ground stations for the launch of the first IDCSP satellites in 1966. As Britain had insufficient industry expertise to build satellites, a contact was placed with U.S. Philco Ford to build Skynet 1, but with the assistance of Marconi to improve UK expertise for Skynet 2.

Nine ground stations were initially planned, which could also communicate with sub-geostationary U.S. IDCSP satellites:
 three principal stations at RAF Oakhanger, Cyprus and Singapore with 40 foot dishes and 20 kW transmitters
 two stations at RAF Bahrain and RAF Gan (Indian Ocean) with air transportable 20 foot dishes and 5kW transmitters called SKYNET V
 two additional air-transportable stations

Skynet 1A was the first military satellite in geostationary orbit, in 1969. The Royal Air Force displayed a model of the Skynet satellite on the children's television show Blue Peter in 1969, the show also described the new British satellite control centre at RAF Oakhanger.

The Skynet satellites provided secure and encrypted facilities, though expensively, for the British armed forces and intelligence agencies. It enables an important sovereign command and control service. The largest user of the Skynet satellites during the Cold War was the Government Communications Headquarters (GCHQ), who were responsible for over 80% of traffic at some locations such as Cyprus. Despite the enormous communications capability of Skynet, GCHQ still found the capacity provided by Skynet to be inadequate. In 1972, GCHQ was still the satellite's largest funder, and argued for the purchase of an American built Type-777 (DSCS II) satellite instead. GCHQ would later plan their own secret signals intelligence satellite, Zircon, which was subsequently cancelled. The circumstances around the reporting of Zircon's existence would become known as the Zircon affair.

Skynet has throughout all its models had a good degree of interoperability with U.S. and NATO military communications satellites and ground stations.

In 2010, the Civil Contingencies Secretariat of the Cabinet Office launched an emergency communications service based on Skynet, called High Integrity Telecommunications System, for use by UK police and other emergency services, primarily for use at Strategic Command Centres and at major events and emergencies. It replaced the earlier Emergency Communications Network.

In 2021 UK Space Command was created, which when fully operational will take over responsibility for Skynet from Strategic Command (previously known as Joint Forces Command), likely in 2023.

Models

Skynet 1 
There were two Skynet 1 satellites (1A and 1B); Skynet 1A was launched on a Delta M on 22 November 1969, but the satellite failed after about 18 months when all of its Traveling Wave Tube Amplifiers (TWTAs) had failed, probably due to soldered high voltage joints failing under thermal cycling. Skynet 1B was launched on a Delta M on 19 August 1970. Skynet 1B was placed in a geostationary transfer orbit (GTO) and was abandoned in transfer orbit (270 x 36058 km) due to a failure of the Thiokol Star 17A apogee kick motor.

The North Atlantic Treaty Organization, NATO 2A and NATO 2B satellites, launched 1970 and 1971, were identical except for an antenna shaped to only cover NATO countries.

Skynet 2 

Following the operational failure of the Skynet 1A satellite, the timetable for the launch of the Skynet 2 communications satellite was delayed. Skynet 2A was launched on the Delta 2313 by NASA for the United Kingdom on 19 January 1974.  A short circuit in an electronics package circuit board (on second stage) left the upper stages and satellite in an unstable low orbit (96 x 3406 km x 37.6°) that rapidly decayed. An investigation revealed that a substandard coating had been used on the circuit board.

Despite being in an unstable orbit, the ground stations successfully located and tracked Skynet 2A and were able to use telemetry readings from the solar panels to determine its alignment. Based on this analysis, it was decided to use the alignment thrusters to deorbit the unit, and it was destroyed when it re-entered the Earth's atmosphere on 24 January 1974.

Skynet 2B was successfully launched on the Delta 2313 by NASA for the United Kingdom on 23 November 1974. It was positioned in geostationary orbit above Kenya to give coverage of Europe, Africa and a substantial part of Asia as far east at the Philippines. It could support about ten simultaneous users. Major ground stations used a 40-foot diameter dish, while in the field or at sea a 2 m diameter dish was used.

The Skynet 2 series satellites were assembled and tested at the Marconi Space and Defence Systems establishment in Portsmouth, England, and were the first non-amateur  communication satellites built outside the United States and USSR. The Signals Research and Development Establishment (SRE) led the development, and performed initial in-orbit testing. Subsequently, the Royal Signals and Radar Establishment supported Skynet satellites, including developing ground terminals and modems, at RAF Defford which was also a backup for the primary ground station at RAF Oakhanger. The Skynet 2B system was very successful for its time, and remained in service for 20 years although only having 2 communications channels.

Skynet 3 
Skynet 3 series satellites was cancelled as the United Kingdom withdrew East of Suez, and instead the capability it was intended to offer was delivered via U.S. and NATO assets. This dependence on U.S. assets was identified as a weakness during the Falklands War and was one of the contributing factors for the emergence of the Skynet 4 series satellites tranche of space vehicles. Technology improvements created the possibility of tactical satellite communications using smaller terminals, creating a new requirement beyond Skynet 3 strategic headquarters communications. The Royal Navy was also concerned that the high frequency radio alternative enabled location tracking by the Soviet Union Ocean Surveillance System.

Skynet 4 

Skynet 4 series satellites have few similarities to the earlier generations, being based on the British Aerospace European Communications Satellite. The cylindrical body of Skynet 1 and 2 was replaced by a large square body housing antennas with deployable solar-cell arrays. This marks the technological improvement from spin-stabilisation, used in earlier cylindrical satellites, to three-axis stabilisation using momentum wheels and reaction wheels controlling the satellite gyroscopically. Each satellite had a design operational life of 7 years.

Skynet 4 manufacture was carried out by British Aerospace Dynamics (BAe Dynamics) with Matra Marconi Space (MMS) providing the Communications payload. NATO adapted the design for the NATO IVA and IVB communication satellites, also manufactured by BAe Dynamics. The programme timescales were delayed, as initially Skynet 4 was designed to be launched from the Space Shuttle (STS), with chosen RAF officers to be part of each Shuttle Crew. However, following the 1986 Challenger disaster (STS 51-L), the programme slowed and all the Skynet 4 series satellites had to be modified to suit the changes needed to go on a disposable launch vehicle. As Skynet 4A build was advanced it needed significant modification, and its completion was overtaken by Skynet 4B which had not progressed as far, and hence more easily converted. Consequently, Skynet 4B was finished first and launched in 1988, with Skynet 4A next in early 1990, and Skynet 4C later the same year. As of 2022, Skynet 4C is still in operation, providing service to the U.S. Amundsen–Scott South Pole Station for up to six hours a day because its orbital inclination has increased to 10.3°.

The Stage 1 satellites (4A, 4B and 4C) have multi-frequency capability and considerable operational flexibility, with selectable channels, gain and four antenna types of differing widths to support varying requirements, Ultra high frequency (UHF), Super high frequency (SHF) and experimental Extremely high frequency (EHF) channels are available. They are hardening against electromagnetic pulse (EMP) and have anti-jamming capability, with an un-degraded 1600 watts power supply.

The improved Stage 2 satellites (4D, 4E and 4F) were built by Matra Marconi Space and Astrium to replace the earlier versions. Improvements included increased power and resistance to electronic jamming. Skynet 4D was launched in 1998, Skynet 4E in 1999 and Skynet 4F in 2001. Skynet 4D was parked in a non-operational supersynchronous orbit on 28 January 2008.

Skynet 4 provides Ultra high frequency and Super high frequency services using Earth cover, wide area and spot beam coverage.

Skynet 5 

Skynet 5 is the next generation of satellites, replacing the existing Skynet 4 Stage 2 satellites. It was contracted via Private Finance Initiative (PFI) to a partnership between 
Paradigm Secure Communications and EADS Astrium, a European spacecraft manufacturer. EADS Astrium was responsible for the build and delivery of Skynet 5 series satellites in orbit, whilst subsidiary company Paradigm was responsible for the provision of service to the Ministry of Defence (MoD). In 2010, the PFI contract was extended by two years to 2022, to a total cost of £3.66 billion over the course of the contract, with Paradigm able to sell bandwidth in excess of the capacity of 1.1 Skynet satellites to other allied countries. Paradigm had 220 staff and about 100 sub-contractors working on Skynet. Serco is a major subcontractor on the PFI programme. This was the biggest ever outsourced military satellite communications contract.

It has four steerable transmission dishes, and a phased-array receiver designed to allow jamming signals to be cancelled out. They will also resist attempts to disrupt them with high-powered lasers.

Astrium described in 2010 the Skynet 5 system as: 

Skynet 5A was launched by an Ariane 5 launch vehicle at 22:03 UTC on 11 March 2007, in a launch shared with the Indian INSAT 4B civil communications satellite, and entered full service on 10 May 2007. The launch was delayed from 10 March 2007 due to malfunction of a launch pad deluge system. Skynet 5A successfully separated from its launch vehicle and telemetry was acquired by its dedicated Control Centre approximately 40 minutes after launch.

Skynet 5B was launched at 22:06 UTC on 14 November 2007, from Centre Spatial Guyanais, Kourou, in French Guiana, aboard an Ariane 5ECA launch vehicle. This launch was delayed from 9 November 2007 due to problems with the electronics on one of the Solid Rocket Boosters (SRB), and 12 November 2007 due to a fuelling problem with the launch pad.

Skynet 5C was launched at 22:05:09 UTC on 12 June 2008, from Centre Spatial Guyanais, Kourou, in French Guiana, aboard an Ariane 5ECA launch vehicle. The launch had been delayed twice. Originally scheduled for 23 May 2008, more checks were carried out on the launch vehicle and the launch was rescheduled for 30 May 2008. A problem with the launch software during pre-launch checks led Arianespace to reschedule the launch for a second time to 12 June 2008.

Skynet 5D was launched at 21:49:07 UTC on 19 December 2012, from Centre Spatial Guyanais, Kourou, in French Guiana, aboard an Ariane 5ECA launch vehicle. Skynet 5D provides more than double the UHF channels of the previous satellites, which are in demand as they support "comms on the move" for soldiers with backpack radios. The Ministry of Defence described the satellite as having a "key role in gathering intelligence on operations", as well as communications. Skynet 5D has larger fuel tanks enabling it to be repositioned more frequently if necessary.

The programme marks a change of approach in the UK from traditional defence procurement methods to a services-based contract which also includes provision of leased ground terminals, Reacher vehicles, the Satellite Communications Onboard Terminal (SCOT) for ships, and the associated baseband equipment.

Initially two Skynet 5 satellites were to be built, with insurance covering any launch loss; the MoD later decided to have a third satellite built in advance, and later still to have the third satellite launched to serve as an on-orbit spare, as well as an option to a fourth satellite, as a cheaper alternative to insurance.

In 2011, The MOD took ownership of a NATO satellite with two UHF channels, to support the additional demands from British involvement in the War in Afghanistan. Control of this satellite was incorporated into the Skynet 5 PFI contract.

The satellites are managed from a site named Hawthorn, a few hundred metres north of MoD Corsham, in partnership with MoD's Defence Digital (previously Information Systems & Services) who are based at MoD Corsham.

Expansion to near global coverage 
In 2010, Paradigm announced it would lease the X-band (SHF) module on the Anik G1 commercial satellite at 107.3° West over the Pacific Ocean, covering the Americas and as far west as Hawaii, to complement Skynet system coverage. The three-channel, wide-beam X-band payload has performance similar to a Skynet 5 satellite, but without the military hardening. Anik G1 launched on 16 April 2013, improving the constellation's X-band capacity to 2.2 GHz of throughput.

In 2015, Skynet 5A was moved from 6° East, where it reinforced Middle East coverage, to 95° East, near West Sumatra. This move was to extend the Skynet coverage eastward in the Indian Ocean and to the western Pacific Ocean. With this move and Anik G1, Skynet offers near global coverage, from 178° West to 163° East.

In 2016, a new Australian ground station was opened at Mawson Lakes, Adelaide, managed by Airbus in partnership with SpeedCast, an Australian provider for over 25 years which works with the Australian military at that base. This complements Airbus's existing chain of ground stations in France, Germany, Norway, United Kingdom and the United States. The British High Commissioner Menna Rawlings said at the opening ceremony "Territorial disputes over uninhabited rocks and reefs have the potential to generate enough friction in international affairs to spark a confrontation", alluding to the territorial disputes in the South China Sea.

Airbus Defence and Space signed a further three partners, Hughes Network Systems, Inmarsat and SpeedCast, into its Skynet partner programme who offer third-party Skynet services. The Skynet contract also allow Airbus to sell surplus bandwidth to NATO and allied governments, including the Five Eyes intelligence alliance (Australia, Canada, New Zealand, the United Kingdom and the United States).

Technical specifications 
The fleet of military X-band satellites have been specifically designed to support smaller, low powered, tactical terminals. Each Skynet 5 satellite is equipped with:

 High power 160W TWTAs on all transponders, giving 56 dBW peak EIRP in each transmit spot beam and 41 dBW peak EIRP in each global beam per transponder
 15 active SHF / EHF transponders ranging in bandwidth from 20 GHz to 40 GHz
 Up to 9 UHF channels
 Multiple fully steerable downlink spot beams
 On Board Active Receive Antenna (OBARA) capable of generating multiple shaped uplink beams
 Flexible switching capability allowing connectivity between any uplink beam and at least two downlink beams
 Nuclear hardening, anti-jamming countermeasures and laser protection

Skynet 6 

As of 2018, the MoD was specifying the replacement of Skynet 5, whose PFI programme ends in August 2022. Airbus Defence and Space will build a non-competitively sourced Skynet 6A satellite planned for a 2025 launch, as a transition to a new architecture. As of 2017, the PFI project was viewed as unlikely to be extended, as PFI contracting was then seen as generally poor value for taxpayers, and it had depleted MoD of satellite expertise which made specifying its replacement difficult.

Skynet 6A is based on the Airbus Eurostar Neo satellite bus, using electric orbit raising and station keeping propulsion, and built at Airbus Stevenage and Portsmouth, England. It uses more radio frequencies for communication, and will have more capacity and versatility than Skynet 5 satellites. A contract for over £500 million was agreed in July 2020, including launch, testing and related ground operations improvements. Due to the delay in agreeing the Skynet 6A contract, preliminary contracts for initial design and to manufacture long lead items had been agreed earlier to prevent end-date slippage. Manufacture of 6A started in October 2021, and a Falcon 9 launch was booked with SpaceX for 2025.

The vision for Skynet 6 is a flexible system architecture that combines UK government, allied and commercial satellites. The MoD has become a user of U.S. military constellations Advanced Extremely High Frequency (AEHF) and the Wideband Global Satcom (WGS) systems, and may become a partner in the Mobile User Objective System (MUOS). Part of the enhanced capability would be to support data links to unmanned aerial vehicles and F-35B Lightning II aircraft.

As of 2019, Skynet is the large part of the MoD Future Beyond Line of Sight Satellite Communications programme (FBLOS), which extends to 2041, and has four elements:
 Skynet 6A, a single transition satellite
 Service Delivery Wrap, a support contract to manage and control the Skynet constellation and ground infrastructure
 Skynet 6 Enduring Capability, to provide and operate communication satellites and ground infrastructure into the future
 Secure Telemetry, Tracking and Command (STT&C), to provide assured UK control and management of satellites and their payloads into the future

As of December 2019, the MoD was processing requests for information from potential bidders for the Skynet 6 Service Delivery Wrap contract.

On 3 July 2020, the UK Government announced that it had acquired a 45% stake in the OneWeb low Earth orbit satellite communications company, for US$500 million including a golden share to give it control over any future ownership sale. Analysts believe OneWeb will be incorporated into the Skynet 6 architecture. OneWeb satellites are already manufactured by a joint venture including Airbus Defence and Space, which positions the current Skynet operator well for future involvement in Skynet 6.

In 2021, a one-year transition is expected to start from the Airbus PFI contract to the new Service Delivery Wrap contract which will operate ground stations until a new generation of satellites under an Enduring Capability contract are launched from about 2028. This transition is expected to cost about £6 billion.

Information assurance 
In early 1999, Reuters reported that the Skynet system was breached by a group of hackers who issued blackmail threats against the MoD. Duncan Campbell reported that the wire reports were wrong.

Satellite summary

See also 

 British Army communications and reconnaissance equipment § Satellite communications
 British space programme
 Defence Intelligence Fusion Centre
 Defense Satellite Communications System
 Reacher Satellite Ground Terminal
 Syracuse (satellite)

Notes

References

External links 
 
 
 Airbus Secure Communications
 www.skyrocket.de
 www.astronautix.com
 Astrium Ltd - manufacturer
 Paradigm Secure Communications
 UK Skynet ground terminal locations
 Satlaunch.org - Satellites M to S
 

1969 establishments in the United Kingdom
Military communications of the United Kingdom
Military satellites
Satellites of the United Kingdom
Space programme of the United Kingdom